Kahthiri is a Maldivian television series developed for Television Maldives by Mariyam Shaugee. Produced by Television Maldives in collaboration with UNFPA, the series stars Arifa Ibrahim, Ibrahim Shakir, Ali Shameel, Hassan Afeef, Ahmed Giyas, Aishath Shiranee, Niuma Mohamed, Aminath Rasheedha, Neena Saleem, Ismail Wajeeh and Reeko Moosa Manik in pivotal roles.

Premise
The series highlights several social issues arising including inadequate housing, absence of birth control measures, improper medical treatments, lack of family planning within a large family living in a congested housing complex.

Adam Manik (Ibrahim Shakir) and Hawwa Manike (Arifa Ibrahim) have seven children; a taxi driver, Mausoom (Ali Shameel), a mechanical engineer, Azmee (Hassan Afeef), a retailer, Saamee (Ahmed Giyas), a TV presenter, Rashfa (Aishath Shiranee), a student pursued to be a doctor, Shiyana (Niuma Mohamed), a spoiled son, Ihusan (Hamdhoon) and Shifa (Aminath Sheleen). Mausoom is married to the righteous woman, Aminath (Aminath Rasheedha) who is the only daughter-in-law in the family with a superior upbringing, while Azmee's wife, Jeeza (Neena Saleem) and Saamee's wife, Farasha (Shahudha)  are two indolent women who prefers to live independent from the family. Mausoom and Adam Manike advise them to sneak away from the clutches of their nasty wives. Aminath gives birth to a child who often gets sick and is later diagnosed to be a Thalassemia patient.

The over protected daughters, Rashfa and Shiyana, secretly start dating a shopkeeper, Umar (Ismail Wajeeh) and a wealthy entrepreneur, Kamil (Reeko Moosa Manik). Unable to tolerate the harshness of Farasha, Saamee divorces her and marries Mariyam. This is followed by additional inconveniences in the family with discrimination against Umar and Jeeza giving birth to a child suffering from a health disorder due to the non-prescribed use of pharmaceutical drugs.

Cast

Main
 Arifa Ibrahim as Hawwa Manike
 Ibrahim Shakir as Adamfulhu
 Ali Shameel as Mausoom
 Hassan Afeef as Azmee
 Ahmed Giyas as Saamee
 Aishath Shiranee as Aishath Rashfa
 Niuma Mohamed as Shiyana
 Aminath Rasheedha as Aminath
 Neena Saleem as Jeeza
 Ismail Wajeeh as Umar
 Reeko Moosa Manik as Kamil
 Zeenath Abbas as Shifa
 Aminath Sheleen as Young Shifa
 Mariyam Rizula as Mariyam

Recurring
 Mariyam Nazima as Areesha; Azmee's second wife
 Shahudha as Farasha; Saamee's first wife
 Suneetha Ali as Suneetha; a choreographer and a friend of Jeeza
 Sithi Fulhu as Faathuma; an old woman who loves spreading gossips
 Hamdhoon as Ihusan; youngest son of the family
 Muaz as Ibrahim; Shifa's drug-addict boyfriend
 Chilhiya Moosa Manik as Ahmed Manik; a friend of Hawwa Manike
 Aminath Shareef as Jeeza’s sister

Guest
 Ibrahim Rasheed as a song director (Episode 9)
 Moosa Zakariyya as Usman; Umar's manager (Episode 6 and 7)
 Aminath Ibrahim Didi as Shareefa; Hawwa Manike's neighbor (Episode 18)

Reception
The series received positive reviews from critics and viewers. Ahmed Adhushan from Mihaaru choose the series among the best Maldivian television series, praising the script of the film for incorporating several issues and blending them with ease into narration. Saajidh Abdulla reviewing from MuniAvas selected the series in the "Top 10 best television series of all time" and wrote: "The series will remain one of the best production in television industry, where several renowned faces were put in one frame, conveying and emphasisng on the importance of several social issues that had been overlooked in the early 90s".

Soundtrack

References

Serial drama television series
Maldivian television shows